Ponaryo Astaman (born 25 September 1979) is a retired Indonesian professional football player. He was part of Indonesia national football team from 2003 until 2013. He was a captain for Indonesian football team. As a player, he already played for several clubs in Indonesia, such as PSM Makassar, Arema FC, Persija Jakarta, and Sriwijaya. He also played in Malaysia with Melaka TMFC in 2006.

He played for PSM Makassar in the 2004 AFC Champions League group stage, where he scored one goal. He played for Arema Malang in the 2007 AFC Champions League group stage.

International Goals

|}

Other international goals

Honours

Club
Sriwijaya
 Indonesia Super League: 2011–12
 Piala Indonesia: 2010
 Indonesian Community Shield: 2010
 Indonesian Inter Island Cup (2): 2010, 2012

National team
Indonesia
 Indonesian Independence Cup: 2008

Individual
 Liga Indonesia Premier Division Best Player: 2004

References

External links
 
 

1979 births
Living people
People from Balikpapan
Indonesian footballers
Indonesia international footballers
2004 AFC Asian Cup players
2007 AFC Asian Cup players
Expatriate footballers in Malaysia
Liga 1 (Indonesia) players
Malaysia Super League players
Association football midfielders
Bontang F.C. players
Melaka TM FC players
PSM Makassar players
Sriwijaya F.C. players
Persija Jakarta players
Arema F.C. players
Borneo F.C. players
Indonesian expatriate footballers
Indonesian expatriate sportspeople in Malaysia
Sportspeople from East Kalimantan